Kadayanallur is a state assembly constituency in Tenkasi district in Tamil Nadu. It is a part of the Tenkasi Lok Sabha constituency. It is one of the 234 State Legislative Assembly Constituencies in Tamil Nadu, in India.

Muslims are the biggest community as a whole in this constituency with around 25% population.

The population of other communities are: 22% Devendra Kula Vellalar, 18% Maravar, 15% Nadar, 10% Konar and 10% Moopanar (Ilai Vaniyar)

In the 2021 MLA election, it is said that the AIADMK party's Mr. Krishnamurali won with the help of Devendra Kula Vellalar votes.

In the 2016 MLA election, both DMK alliance and AIADMK candidates were Muslims, but the DMK alliance's Muslim candidate won.

It is said that the majority of the Devendra Kula Vellalars voted for DMK alliance's Muslim candidate in the 2016 MLA election.

Madras State

Tamil Nadu

Election Results

2021

2016

2011

2006

2001

1996

1991

1989

1984

1980

1977

1971

1967

References 

 

Assembly constituencies of Tamil Nadu
Tirunelveli district